The Bensen B-5 was a small rotor kite developed by Igor Bensen in the United States and offered and marketed for home building in 1954. Dubbed the "Gyro-Glider", it was the first of several such designs that would be sold by Bensen Aircraft Corporation over the following decades.

The B-5 was built around a cruciform frame of aluminum tube. Landing wheels were fitted to three points of this cross, and a mast was fitted above its centre to support the rotor hub. The fourth arm of the cross provided a mounting for a large, plywood fin and rudder, reminiscent of that of the Raoul Hafner's Rotachute that had shaped Bensen's thinking about rotor kite design.

The aircraft was intended to be towed behind a car, and could be built at home from easily obtained materials in about three to four weeks.

The B-5 was also the model converted to the Bensen Mid-Jet which was powered by two tip mounted ramjets for military use.

References

External links
 Bensen Aircraft Foundation 
 "Front Cover" Popular Science, July 1954.

1950s United States sport aircraft
Rotor kites
B-05
Homebuilt aircraft
Aircraft first flown in 1953